The Ora Holland House, also known as the Holland-Viner House, is a historic building located in Dubuque, Iowa, United States.  Holland  was a contractor-builder who came to Dubuque from Vermont in 1846 by way of Jacksonville, Illinois where he learned his trade.  He built his house over a period of two years because of other projects he was involved with, completing construction in 1857.  Holland acquired the property from the Langworthy brothers, who were the first prominent citizens of Dubuque to settle above the bluff.  The two-story brick residence is reminiscent of the Federal style.  The entry, heavy window cornices and parapets reflect the Greek Revival style.  The house was listed on the National Register of Historic Places in 1986.

References

Houses completed in 1857
Federal architecture in Iowa
Houses in Dubuque, Iowa
National Register of Historic Places in Dubuque, Iowa
Houses on the National Register of Historic Places in Iowa
1857 establishments in Iowa